"Clementine" is the second single released from Take That band member Mark Owen's debut solo album, Green Man. The single was released on 3 February 1997. The single peaked at number three on the UK Singles Chart, his second successive single at that ranking.

Track listings

UK CD1
 "Clementine" (remix)
 "Clementine" (acoustic version)
 "Child" (radio edit)
 "Child" (acoustic version)

UK CD2
 "Clementine" (remix)
 "Child" (live at Abbey Road)
 "Are You with Me" (live at Abbey Road)
 "I Am What I Am" (live at Abbey Road)

UK cassette single
 "Clementine" (remix)
 "Child" (acoustic version)

European CD single
 "Clementine" (radio edit)
 "Clementine" (acoustic version)

Australian CD single
 "Clementine" (radio edit)
 "Clementine" (acoustic version)
 "Child" (live at Abbey Road)
 "I Am What I Am" (live at Abbey Road)

Japanese CD single
 "Clementine" (radio edit)
 "Clementine" (acoustic version)
 "Child" (live at Abbey Road)
 "Are You with Me" (live at Abbey Road)
 "I Am What I Am" (live at Abbey Road)

Charts

References

1996 songs
1997 singles
Bertelsmann Music Group singles
Mark Owen songs
RCA Records singles
Songs written by Mark Owen